Fludioxonil is a non-systemic fungicide, introduced in 1993 by Ciba-Geigy (now Syngenta). It is used for the treatment of crops, particularly cereals, fruits and vegetables, and ornamental plants.  It is often used in combination with another fungicide such as Cyprodinil.

Its mode of action is to inhibit transport-associated phosphorylation of glucose, which reduces mycelial growth rate. Fludioxonil is used against Fusarium, Rhizoctonia, Alternaria, and Botrytis cinerea. There was a particularly bad crop failure due to multiresistant B. cinerea in strawberry in Florida in 2012; in that year and many other years, fludioxonil is the only a.i. still providing any protection.

It is a structural analog of the natural fungicide pyrrolnitrin.

Brand names include seed treatments: Celest, Agri Star Fludioxonil 41 ST, Dyna-shield Fludioxonil, Maxim 4 FS, and Spirato 480 FS, as well as foliar applications: Switch (fludioxonil + cyprodinil).

Environmental hazards

It is toxic to fish and other aquatic organisms.

See also
 1,3-Benzodioxole

References

Fungicides
Pyrroles
Nitriles